France Bleu Radio Corsica Frequenza Mora, usually just shortened to France Bleu RCFM, is a generalist radio station serving the island of Corsica. It broadcasts in both French and Corsican.

History 
The station was established as Radio Corse Frequenza Mora (RCFM) in 1984, 2 years after the appearance of the first regional programs on the local France Inter station. On September 4, 2000, RCFM became connected to the new France Bleu network.

In November 2015, a second studio was added at Place du Donjon, in Bastia, alongside the original one located in Residence du Parc (Ajaccio).

On January 1, 2016, the AM radio section was shut off, one of the last in Europe.

Other links 

 France Bleu
 Radio France
 List of radio stations in France

References 

Radio stations in France
Radio stations established in 1984
1984 establishments in France
Radio France